Széchy or Szécsi was a Hungarian noble family in the Kingdom of Hungary with notable members in the 13th, 14th and 15th centuries. The members of the Széchy family held high offices at the church and the royal court.
The family had two branches (the branch Széchy de Rimaszécs and branch Széchy de Felsőlindva).  They family derived from the Balogh genus (clan) and their first names were Zech, Zechi, Zeechi according to the documents. The family came up from the beginning of the 13th. Documents justify that Joanka de genere Balogh lived in the era of Béla IV of Hungary.

Notable members of the family

Branch of Felsőlindva
Nicholas Szécsi
Nicholas (II) Szécsi
Frank Szécsi
Dénes Szécsi

Branch of Rimaszécs
Dénes I.

See also
List of titled noble families in the Kingdom of Hungary

References

External links

Lexicon of Pallas